Arthur Daly or Daley may refer to:

Arthur Daly (cricketer) (1833–1898), English first-class player for Middlesex in 1866
Arthur Daly (British Army officer) (1871–1936), senior commander in Boer War and First World War
Arthur Daley (sportswriter) (1904–1974), American recipient of Pulitzer Prize for The New York Times

Fictional characters
Arthur Daley, unscrupulous Londoner played by George Cole in 1979 British TV series Minder